Pek Jin Shen (born 12 September 1992), better known by his stage name Shigga Shay (stylised as ShiGGa Shay—the capitalised "GG" representing "Grizzle Grind"), is a Singaporean hip hop artist, songwriter, director and music producer.

He has been featured on the covers of Juice, the Today newspaper and the Pioneer Magazine. Having had over two million YouTube views, he has also been labeled one of the top 50 men to look out for in 2015 by the Esquire Magazine. ShiGGa is also a founder member of hip hop group Grizzle Grind Crew, as well as production company Grizzle Films.

Early life and education
Pek Jin Shen was born on 12 September 1992 in Singapore. He developed his interest in hip hop music and rapping at the age of nine, after his mother purchased him a few English hip hop records. Pek's father died in 2009 of colon cancer. 

He attended Henry Park Primary School, Queensway Secondary School before graduating from Singapore Polytechnic with a diploma in media and communication.

Career
ShiGGa Shay is an onomatopoeic play on the Chinese words, “是个谁” from “你是个谁,” which translates to mean "who is it" or “who are you”.

One of his ShiGGa's earliest appearances on the public stage was when he was still a "raw, cocky" 16-year-old, at the show Live N Loaded by MediaCorp. According to Shigga himself, the stage name of "Shigga Shay" was just dreamt up by him at age 14. ShiGGa's music is rooted in hip hop. As of 2012, he has released one mixtape and one extended play album, ShiGGa Shay's in the Building (2010) and They Call Me ShiGGa (2012) respectively. ShiGGa Shay's in the Building was reportedly recorded solely in Shigga's bedroom.

On 16 December 2012, ShiGGa was named the "Unsigned Talent of The Week" by WorldStarHipHop. ShiGGa is the "youngest hip-hop artist to have made it on the Singapore radio charts [...]", according to Aging Youth. In June 2013, he released "LimPeh" (English: Your Dad), an English-Chinese-Hokkien rap song which became a chart-topper in Singapore. It features guest vocals from Tosh Rock and Wang Weiliang. Other notable works include Lion City Kia, ShiGGa Morning and the official theme song for 3688, Ta Pau.

During his two-year compulsory National Service, he was a member of the SAF Music & Drama Company (MDC). During this time he performed for the Ah Boys to Men musical, Rockhampton and the MDC 40th anniversary alongside other MDC alumni: Jack Neo, Dick Lee, JJ Lin, Jeremy Monterio and more. He said in an interview with The Straits Times, "Before MDC, I was just a rapper but my time there made me an all-round performer,"

ShiGGa had a few notable performances throughout his musical career. He was part of Singapore's National Day Parade 2015, leading one major rap segment. He was part of Sing50 concert and performed in the hip-hop segment with Apl.de.ap from the Black Eyed Peas. During that year he also collaborated with Dick Lee during this performance. He was also part of the SG50 album, "Sing, Love", where he collaborated with Stefanie Sun in a duet titled "Simply Love" which they also performed live during the albums showcase. Other notable performances in 2015 include: SEA games 2015, Pink dot 2015, Digital fashion week 2015, the Shine youth Festival 2015.

In 2015 ShiGGa released his first full-length self-titled album.

In August 2016, ShiGGa performed at the White House state dinner after-party at which he, along with the local singer, Tabitha Nauser, were invited to perform by the US Ambassador to Singapore, Kirk Wagar.

Influences 
He considers artists like The Notorious B.I.G., 2Pac, Eminem, and Jay-Z as his influences.

Music Videos 
Through his production company, Grizzle Films, ShiGGa Shay not only directs his own music videos but also directed multiple music videos such as the Starhub Chinese New year Commercial 2014 "Wang Ah!" as well as the Singapore version of the Durex-MTV global sex-ed campaign "Somebody like me" that featured The Sam Willows. He also directed the music video for the song 我们的故事 of Jack Neo's movie, The Lion Men.

Discography

Studio albums

Extended Plays

Singles

As lead artist

As featured artist

Music Videos

Filmography

Movies

Music video appearances

See also 

 Sylvia Ratonel
 Inch Chua
 The Sam Willows
 Gentle Bones
 Tabitha Nauser
 Jay Park

References

External links 
 
 

1992 births
Singaporean musicians
Living people
Singaporean hiphop musicians
Singaporean people of Chinese descent
Singapore Polytechnic alumni